A British Overseas Territories citizen holds British nationality by virtue of a connection with a British Overseas Territory.

British Overseas Territories citizens (BOTCs) enjoy visa-free entry to a number of countries and territories. However, in some cases, foreign authorities only grant them a visa-free entry if they present a passport with an endorsement stating their right of abode in the United Kingdom.

Visa requirements for other classes of British nationals such as British citizens, British Nationals (Overseas), British Overseas citizens, British Protected Persons or British Subjects are different.

Passports
British passports issued to British Overseas Territories Citizens include:
 Anguillian passport
 Bermudian passport
 British Virgin Islands passport
 Caymanian passport
 Gibraltar passport
 Montserratian passport
 Pitcairn Islands passport 
 Saint Helena passport
 Turks and Caicos Islands passport

Visa requirements map

Visa requirements

British Crown Dependencies and Overseas Territories

Territories and disputed areas

Entry to the United Kingdom
BOTCs only have visa-free entry to the UK if they have a certificate of right of abode or if they have obtained and are travelling on a full British Citizen passport. Otherwise a visa is not required for a visit of up to six months, for example as a General Visitor or as a Short-Term Student, but a visa is required for other study, for work, for joining family or for any other stay of more than six months.

Right to consular protection

When in a country where there is no British embassy, British Overseas Territories citizens may get help from the embassy of any other Commonwealth country present in that country. There are also informal arrangements with some other countries, including Australia, to help British nationals in some countries.

See also List of diplomatic missions of the United Kingdom

Non-visa restrictions

Fingerprinting
Several countries including Argentina, Cambodia, Japan, Malaysia, Saudi Arabia, South Korea and the United States demand all adult passengers (age varies by country) to be fingerprinted on arrival.

Foreign travel statistics

See also

Visa policy of the British Overseas Territories
Visa requirements for British citizens
Visa requirements for British Overseas Citizens
Visa requirements for British Nationals (Overseas)
British Overseas Territories Citizens in the United Kingdom

References and Notes
References

Notes

British Overseas Territories Citizens
British passports